Petunia Tupou is a Tongan lawyer and jurist. Since 2022 she has been a judge of the Supreme Court of Tonga.

Tupou was educated at the University of Waikato in New Zealand, graduating in 1996 with a BA and LLB. She was admitted to the bar in New Zealand in 1996, and in Tonga in 1997. In September 2015 she was appointed honorary consul for the Netherlands. She is also chair of the Tonga Broadcasting Commission. In April 2021 she was appointed to the board of the Tonga Tourism Authority.

In September 2020 she was made a King's Counsel. In July 2022 she was appointed as a judge of the Supreme Court of Tonga, replacing Laki Niu. She was the second woman appointed as a judge, after 'Elisapeti Langi. She will be sworn in on 1 August 2022.

Honours
National honours
  Order of the Crown of Tonga, Member (6 July 2021).

References

Living people
University of Waikato alumni
Tongan lawyers
Honorary consuls
Tongan civil servants
Supreme Court of Tonga justices
Members of the Order of the Crown of Tonga
Year of birth missing (living people)